"Born in '58" is the last single from Bruce Dickinson's debut solo album, Tattooed Millionaire, released on March 25, 1991. The song is about Bruce Dickinson's early life, growing up with his Grandparents in Worksop (Dickinson was born in 1958).

Track listing 
 Born in '58 – 03:40
 Tattooed Millionaire (live) – 04:36 
 Son of a Gun (live) – 05:53

Tracks 2 and 3 were recorded live at The Astoria Theatre in London, England in June 1990.

Personnel
 Bruce Dickinson – Vocals
 Janick Gers – Guitar
 Andy Carr – Bass
 Fabio Del Rio – Drums

Chart positions

References 

1990 singles
Bruce Dickinson songs
Songs written by Bruce Dickinson
1990 songs
Sony Music singles
Songs written by Janick Gers